This is a list of documentary films produced in the Colombian cinema, ordered by year and decade of release.

1910s

1920s

1930s

1940s

1960s

1970s

1980s

1990s

2000s

2010s

See also 

 List of Colombian films

References

External links
 Proimágenes Colombia Official Website

Colombia
Documentary films
Colombia